Wolfgang William Van Halen (born March 16, 1991) is an American musician. The son of actress Valerie Bertinelli and guitarist Eddie Van Halen, he performed alongside his father as the bassist for the rock band Van Halen from 2006 to 2020. He also performed with the heavy metal band Tremonti from 2012 to 2016. After his father's death in 2020 led to the disbandment of Van Halen, he began to focus on his solo project Mammoth WVH, in which he performs all instruments and vocals. His project's self-titled debut was released in 2021.

Career

Early life
The Van Halen instrumental "316" (from the album For Unlawful Carnal Knowledge) refers to his birthday. For a 13-year period ending in 2004, Eddie Van Halen collaborated with Peavey on a line of guitars, the Wolfgang series, named after his son. In 2008, his father named a custom guitar after him, the Fender EVH Wolfgang.

Wolfgang started his musical career as a drummer. He often watched his father rehearse, and at times would try to play his uncle Alex's drum kit, whereupon the latter would give him a few lessons. Wolfgang started playing drums at the age of nine, mostly self-taught with only few lessons from his uncle, and got his first drum set from his father as a present for his tenth birthday. Some time later he moved on to guitar and bass. He can also play keyboards and "figure things out by ear".  Wolfgang later began actively participating in Van Halen, the band. He also made guest appearances during some dates of Van Halen's 2004 tour, appearing during his father's extended guitar solo spot and playing "316" with him.

Van Halen
In late 2006, in an interview with Guitar World, Eddie Van Halen confirmed that his son would replace Michael Anthony as Van Halen's bassist. Wolfgang first toured with Van Halen in his new capacity in 2007. In August 2010, Van Halen announced that they would record a new album, with Wolfgang playing bass.

In early 2008, Van Halen appeared on the cover of the April issue of Guitar World with his father, in the magazine's first father-son issue.

He recorded his only studio album with Van Halen, A Different Kind of Truth, in 2011. The album was released on February 7, 2012.

Tremonti

On September 10, 2012, Alter Bridge and Creed guitarist Mark Tremonti announced that Van Halen would be filling in for Brian Marshall as bassist for the first tour of Tremonti's eponymous band. Tremonti's first album, All I Was, was released on July 17 of that year. Van Halen became an official member of Tremonti in 2013, replacing previous bassist Brian Marshall. He appears on the band's 2015 studio album Cauterize and its 2016 follow-up Dust.

Clint Lowery
Sevendust guitarist Clint Lowery revealed in a June 2019 tweet on Twitter that Wolfgang would play on his solo debut. "[Wolfgang] will be playing drums, maybe some bass," he says. "I'll do the rest. Just not good enough on the kit myself to pull it off in [the] studio."

Mammoth WVH
In 2021, Wolfgang released his debut album Mammoth WVH under the same name. The LP showcased his talents as a songwriter and musician with the artist writing every song and playing every instrument on the studio album. After the album's release, Mammoth WVH began touring, with Frank Sidoris, Jon Jourdan, Ronnie Ficarro, and Garrett Whitlock rounding out the touring lineup.

Awards and recognition
Wolfgang was nominated for a 2022 Grammy Award in the category of Best Rock Song for his song "Distance", from his album Mammoth WVH. He wrote the song when his  father was dealing with complications from cancer. "[Eddie] cried when he first heard it. It was a really special moment that I'll never forget." Both "Distance" and his second single, "Don't Back Down", debuted at #1 on the Billboard's Mainstream Rock Airplay Chart. "The Wolfgang Van Halen-led band is the first act to send its first two songs to No. 1 on the chart since The Glorious Sons in 2019."

Musical style
Van Halen started playing the bass as his father started asking if he wanted to play with him. Van Halen first viewed bass as "an easier version of guitar, but as soon as I started playing it I realized how wrong that was", but stated that his experience with a guitar made it easier for him to deal with the instrument. His style was described by Eddie as a "rhythm bassist, like I'm a rhythm guitarist and a bassist put together."  When he first began playing bass, his inspirations were Les Claypool of Primus and Justin Chancellor of Tool. He also enjoys Chris Wolstenholme of Muse, John Entwistle of The Who, Jack Bruce of Cream "and all of the classic players".

Wolfgang's musical style mainly consists of the hard rock, alternative rock, and heavy metal genres. However, he has also released a few pop songs under the Mammoth WVH name, namely "Think It Over" and "Distance".

Personal life
Named in homage to the classical composer Wolfgang Amadeus Mozart, he is the only child of Dutch-American guitarist Eddie Van Halen and Italian-American actress Valerie Bertinelli. He is also the nephew of drummer Alex Van Halen. Wolfgang has said that he did not know his father was a famous musician until he "started picking up CDs and saw his father's picture on them".

Following the completion of the 2007–2008 Van Halen tour, Wolfgang returned to school. Planning to graduate by the summer of 2009, he would graduate in 2010. Wolfgang Van Halen appears as the bassist for Van Halen in Guitar Hero: Van Halen, even replacing Michael Anthony in the band's past incarnation. Wolfgang remained in Van Halen until 2020 when the band disbanded following his father's death.

Wolfgang Van Halen announced his engagement to longtime girlfriend Andraia Allsop on July 6, 2022.

Discography
with Van Halen
 A Different Kind of Truth (2012)
 Tokyo Dome Live in Concert (2015)

with Tremonti
 Cauterize (2015)
 Dust (2016)

with Mammoth WVH
 Mammoth WVH (2021)

as a featured musician
 The Strange Case Of... by Halestorm (2012)
 God Bless the Renegades by Clint Lowery (2020)

References

External links

Official Mammoth WVH Website
Official Mammoth WVH Twitter
Official Van Halen Website
Official Wolfgang Van Halen Twitter

1991 births
Living people
American male guitarists
American rock bass guitarists
American male bass guitarists
Musicians from Santa Monica, California
Van Halen members
Guitarists from California
Tremonti (band) members
21st-century American guitarists
21st-century American bass guitarists
American people of Dutch-Indonesian descent
American people of Javanese descent
American people of Italian descent
American people of English descent